Alan Wood Lukens (February 12, 1924 – January 5, 2019) was an American diplomat who served as the ambassador to People's Republic of the Congo from 1984 to 1987 and held other diplomatic posts throughout Africa. He died in January 2019 at the age of 94.

Early life

Lukens was born in Philadelphia, Pennsylvania, son of Edward and Francis (Day) Lukens. He attended the Episcopal Academy, continuing his education at Princeton University, Class of 1946.  He did not actually graduate until 1948 because he interrupted his studies to join the army.

He served in the Second World War in the 20th Armored Division, landed on Utah Beach on D-Day and experienced bitter fighting in the Rhine valley. His division was involved with the Liberation of Dachau concentration camp on April 29, 1945.

Foreign Service

He joined the Foreign Service in 1951.  Vice consul in Istanbul from 1952 to 1953.  Charge d' affaires, Central African Republic 1961, Paris 1961–1963, Morocco 1963–1965. Deputy chief of mission Dakar 1967–1970, Nairobi 1970-1972 and Copenhagen 1975–1978. Lukens retired from the State Department in 1993.  President of the 20th Armored Division association and commander of American Legion Post 136 in Greenbelt, Maryland.

References

1924 births
2019 deaths
Episcopal Academy alumni
Ambassadors of the United States to the Republic of the Congo
People from Philadelphia
United States Army soldiers
United States Department of State officials
United States Foreign Service personnel
Princeton University alumni